Sept-Îles/Lac Rapides Water Aerodrome  is located on Lac des Rapides near Sept-Îles, Quebec, Canada.

It is classified as an airport of entry by Nav Canada and is staffed by the Canada Border Services Agency (CBSA). CBSA officers at this airport can handle general aviation aircraft only, with no more than fifteen passengers.

See also
Sept-Îles Airport

References

Registered aerodromes in Côte-Nord
Transport in Sept-Îles, Quebec
Seaplane bases in Quebec